Ford is an unincorporated community in Stevens County, Washington, United States. Ford has a post office with ZIP code 99013. Ford has a nondenominational community church. A little-known historical monument commemorating the Tshimakain Mission stands just outside of the main town.

References

Unincorporated communities in Stevens County, Washington
Unincorporated communities in Washington (state)